The Big Preview was a movie venue that aired on New York City television station WOR-TV (Channel 9) beginning in the early 1960s and continuing into the early 1980s. It could be seen on Sundays (for a time, it also aired on Saturdays) starting somewhere between 5 and 6:30 PM and ran an eclectic mix of films. In addition, there was a Monday night edition of The Big Preview that ran from 1967 to 1968 at 9 PM.

Some movies that were shown were:

 A Lovely Way to Die
 Beware! The Blob
 Blacula
 Cat People (1942)
 Count Yorga, Vampire
 Day of the Wolves
 Destry
 Grave of the Vampire
 It Came from Beneath the Sea
 King Kong Escapes
 King Kong vs. Godzilla
 Lisa and the Devil
 Macabre (1958)
 Monster on the Campus
 P.J. (1968)
 Son of Frankenstein
 The Little Shop of Horrors
 The Man Who Haunted Himself
 The Unsuspected

References and footnotes

Culture of New York City
1960s American television series
1970s American television series
1980s American television series
Local motion picture television series